Ersin Durgut (born 4 August 1982) is a Turkish volleyball player. He is 208 cm and plays as middle blocker. He plays for Fenerbahçe Grundig and wears 2 numbers. He played 25 times for national team. He also played for Erdemirspor and won 3 Turkish Men's Volleyball League. He also played Halkbank Ankara.

He capped 58 times for national.

Honours and awards
 2001-02 Turkish Men's Volleyball League Champion with Erdemirspor
 2003-04 Turkish Men's Volleyball League Champion with Erdemirspor
 2004-05 Turkish Men's Volleyball League Champion with Erdemirspor
 2010-11 Turkish Men's Volleyball League Champion with Fenerbahçe
 2011-12 Turkish Men's Volleyball League Champion with Fenerbahçe
 2011-12 Turkish Volleyball Cup Champion with Fenerbahçe
 2011-12 Turkish Volleyball Super Cup Champion with Fenerbahçe

References

External links
 Player profile at fenerbahce.org

1982 births
Living people
Turkish men's volleyball players
Fenerbahçe volleyballers
21st-century Turkish people